Tsvetan Sokolov (born 31 December 1989) is a Bulgarian professional volleyball player, a member of the Bulgarian national team and Russian club Dynamo Moscow, a participant at the Olympic Games London 2012. Sokolov is a multiple winner of the Champions League and Club World Championship, three–time Italian Champion (2011, 2017, 2019), Turkish Champion (2016), Russian Champion (2021).

Personal life
Sokolov was born in Dupnitsa, Bulgaria. In 2014, he married Deliyana Hristova. On 27 October 2014, his wife gave birth to their children – twins Nikola and Viktor.

Honours

Clubs
 CEV Champions League
  2009/2010 – with Itas Diatec Trentino
  2010/2011 – with Itas Diatec Trentino
  2018/2019 – with Cucine Lube Civitanova

 FIVB Club World Championship
  Doha 2009 – with Itas Diatec Trentino
  Doha 2010 – with Itas Diatec Trentino
  Doha 2011 – with Itas Diatec Trentino
  Poland 2018 – with Cucine Lube Civitanova
  Betim 2019 – with Zenit Kazan

 CEV Cup
  2020/2021 – with Dynamo Moscow

 National championships
 2009/2010  Italian Cup, with Itas Diatec Trentino
 2010/2011  Italian Championship, with Itas Diatec Trentino
 2011/2012  Italian SuperCup, with Itas Diatec Trentino
 2011/2012  Italian Cup, with Itas Diatec Trentino
 2013/2014  Italian SuperCup, with Diatec Trentino
 2014/2015  Turkish SuperCup, with Halkbank Ankara
 2014/2015  Turkish Cup, with Halkbank Ankara
 2015/2016  Turkish SuperCup, with Halkbank Ankara
 2015/2016  Turkish Championship, with Halkbank Ankara
 2016/2017  Italian Cup, with Cucine Lube Civitanova
 2016/2017  Italian Championship, with Cucine Lube Civitanova
 2018/2019  Italian Championship, with Cucine Lube Civitanova
 2019/2020  Russian Cup, with Zenit Kazan
 2020/2021  Russian Cup, with Dynamo Moscow
 2020/2021  Russian Championship, with Dynamo Moscow
 2020/2021  Russian SuperCup, with Dynamo Moscow
 2021/2022  Russian Championship, with Dynamo Moscow
 2021/2022  Russian SuperCup, with Dynamo Moscow

Individual awards
 2013: FIVB World League – Best Opposite Spiker
 2013: FIVB Club World Championship – Best Opposite Spiker
 2017: FIVB Club World Championship – Best Opposite Spiker
 2018: CEV Champions League – Best Opposite Spiker
 2018: FIVB Club World Championship – Best Opposite Spiker

References

External links

 
 Player profile at LegaVolley.it  
 Player profile at Volleybox.net

1989 births
Living people
People from Dupnitsa
Sportspeople from Kyustendil Province
Bulgarian men's volleyball players
Olympic volleyball players of Bulgaria
Volleyball players at the 2012 Summer Olympics
Bulgarian expatriate sportspeople in Italy
Expatriate volleyball players in Italy
Bulgarian expatriate sportspeople in Turkey
Expatriate volleyball players in Turkey
Bulgarian expatriate sportspeople in Russia
Expatriate volleyball players in Russia
Trentino Volley players
Halkbank volleyball players
Volley Lube players
VC Zenit Kazan players
Opposite hitters